Agha Syed Mehmood Shah is a Pakistani politician who has been a member of the National Assembly of Pakistan since August 2018.

Political career
He was elected to the National Assembly of Pakistan from Constituency NA-267 (Mastung-cum-Shaheed Sikandarabad-cum-Kalat) as a candidate of Muttahida Majlis-e-Amal in 2018 Pakistani general election.

References

His father Syed Agha Sadiqee Shah was elected MNA in 1993 brother Agha Fazal-ur-Rehman Shah was the Chairman District Kalat.

Living people
Pakistani MNAs 2018–2023
Muttahida Majlis-e-Amal MNAs
[[Category:Year of birth 1st January, 1975
(living people)]]
Year of birth missing (living people)